Tomasz Bednarek and Andreas Siljeström were the defending champions but Siljeström decided not to participate.
Bednarek paired up with Olivier Charroin.
Laurynas Grigelis and Rameez Junaid won the title, defeating Stéphane Robert and Laurent Rochette 1–6, 6–2, [10–6] in the final.

Seeds
The top seeded team received a bye into the quarterfinals.

Draw

Draw

External links
 Main Draw

Open Prevadies Saint-Brieuc - Doubles
2012 Doubles